The Ministry of Infrastructure and Transport (Ministero delle Infrastrutture e dei Trasporti or MIT) is the government ministry for transport in the Republic of Italy. It is responsible for all transport infrastructure (roads, motorways, railways, ports, airports) as well as general transport planning and logistics, especially for urban transport schemes, with a particular attention at their sustainability. It is led by the Italian Minister of Sustainable Infrastructures and Mobility.

History
In 2021, the Ministry was renamed Ministry of Sustainable Infrastructure and Mobility (Ministero delle Infrastrutture e della Mobilità Sostenibili or MIMS). However, it reverted to its previous name in November 2022.

Ministry of Public Works
The Ministry of Public Works was a ministry in the government of Italy dealing with all infrastructure matters, including roads, motorways, railways, ports, airports and other means of transport.  It was set up in 1860, under the government of Camillo Benso, Count of Cavour, with the first ministerial post being held by Stefano Jacini.

Ministry of Transport
The Ministry of Transport was born on 12 December 1944 when the third Bonomi government split the then Ministry of Communications into a Ministry of Transport and a Ministry for Post and Telecommunications.

Corps of the Port Captaincies – Coast Guard

The Corps of the Port Captaincies – Coast Guard is the coast guard of Italy and is part of the Italian Navy under the control of the Ministry of Infrastructure and Transport (Italy)|Ministry of Infrastructure and Transport. Its head office is in Rome.

Bassanini reforms and birth of the modern Ministry
On 11 June 2001, the second Berlusconi government was the first Italian government in history not to have a specific minister for public works, since the Ministry of Public Works, the Ministry of Transport and the Ministry for Post and Telecommunications had all been merged into the new Ministry of Infrastructure and Transport, created by the Bassanini reforms of 1999 (coming into force in 2001).

References

External links

 

Infrastructure
Italy
Ministries established in 2001
Italy
2001 establishments in Italy
Transport organisations based in Italy